Maksim Omelyanchuk (born 5 September 2003) is a Belarusian professional footballer who plays for Energetik-BGU Minsk.

He's a son of former Belarus international footballer Sergey Omelyanchuk.

References

External links 
 
 Profile at Energetik-BGU website

2003 births
Living people
Belarusian footballers
Association football midfielders
FC Energetik-BGU Minsk players